The name Beth has been used for three tropical cyclones worldwide, one each in the Atlantic Ocean, the Australian region of the South Pacific Ocean, and the Western Pacific Ocean.

 Hurricane Beth (1971) – a Category 1 hurricane that formed of the southeast coast of the U.S. and struck Nova Scotia, Canada.
 Cyclone Beth (1976) – a Category 3 severe tropical cyclone that struck Queensland, Australia.
 Tropical Storm Beth (1996) (T9622, 32W, Seniang) – a severe tropical storm that struck the Philippines and Vietnam.

Atlantic hurricane set index articles
Australian region cyclone set index articles
Pacific typhoon set index articles